The 1948–49 season was the 76th season of competitive football in Scotland and the 52nd season of the Scottish Football League. Rangers became the first team to win the Scottish domestic treble. At the end of the season, Scottish Division C was split into two regional sections. It would be 26 years before a set-up with three national divisions would be in place again.

Scottish League Division A

Champions: Rangers 
Relegated: Greenock Morton, Albion Rovers

Scottish League Division B

Champions: Raith Rovers, Stirling Albion
Relegated: East Stirlingshire

Scottish League Division C

Source: RSSSF

Cup honours

Other Honours

National

County

 * - aggregate over two legs
  - replay

Highland League

Scotland national team

Scotland were winners of the 1949 British Home Championship.

Key:
 (H) = Home match
 (A) = Away match
 BHC = British Home Championship

Notes and references

External links
Scottish Football Historical Archive